In enzymology, a trans-cinnamate 4-monooxygenase is an enzyme that catalyzes the chemical reaction

trans-cinnamate + NADPH + H+ + O2  4-hydroxycinnamate + NADP+ + H2O

The 4 substrates of this enzyme are trans-cinnamate, NADPH, H+, and O2, whereas its 3 products are 4-hydroxycinnamate, NADP+, and H2O. This enzyme participates in phenylalanine metabolism and phenylpropanoid biosynthesis.  It employs one cofactor, heme.

This enzyme belongs to the family of oxidoreductases, specifically those acting on paired donors, with O2 as oxidant and incorporation or reduction of oxygen. The oxygen incorporated need not be derived from O2 with NADH or NADPH as one donor, and incorporation of one atom o oxygen into the other donor.

Nomenclature 

The systematic name of this enzyme class is trans-cinnamate,NADPH:oxygen oxidoreductase (4-hydroxylating). Other names in common use include:

 cinnamic acid 4-hydroxylase,
 oxygenase, cinnamate 4-mono-,
 CA4H (gene name), 
 CYP73A1 (gene name),
 cytochrome P450 cinnamate 4-hydroxylase,
 cinnamate 4-hydroxylase,
 cinnamate 4-monooxygenase,
 cinnamate hydroxylase,
 cinnamic 4-hydroxylase,
 cinnamic acid 4-monooxygenase,
 cinnamic acid p-hydroxylase,
 hydroxylase, cinnamate 4-,
 t-cinnamic acid hydroxylase,
 trans-cinnamate 4-hydroxylase, and
 trans-cinnamic acid 4-hydroxylase.

References

Further reading 

 
 
 

EC 1.14.13
NADPH-dependent enzymes
Heme enzymes
Enzymes of unknown structure